In geometry, the hexagonal tiling or hexagonal tessellation is a regular tiling of the Euclidean plane, in which exactly three hexagons meet at each vertex.

English mathematician John Conway called it a hextille.

The internal angle of the hexagon is 120 degrees, so three hexagons at a point make a full 360 degrees. It is one of three regular tilings of the plane. The other two are the triangular tiling and the square tiling.

Applications 
Hexagonal tiling is the densest way to arrange circles in two dimensions. The honeycomb conjecture states that hexagonal tiling is the best way to divide a surface into regions of equal area with the least total perimeter. The optimal three-dimensional structure for making honeycomb (or rather, soap bubbles) was investigated by Lord Kelvin, who believed that the Kelvin structure (or body-centered cubic lattice) is optimal. However, the less regular Weaire–Phelan structure is slightly better.

This structure exists naturally in the form of graphite, where each sheet of graphene resembles chicken wire, with strong covalent carbon bonds. Tubular graphene sheets have been synthesised, known as carbon nanotubes. They have many potential applications, due to their high tensile strength and electrical properties. Silicene is similar.

Chicken wire consists of a hexagonal lattice (often not regular) of wires.

The hexagonal tiling appears in many crystals. In three dimensions, the face-centered cubic and hexagonal close packing are common crystal structures. They are the densest sphere packings in three dimensions. Structurally, they comprise parallel layers of hexagonal tilings, similar to the structure of graphite. They differ in the way that the layers are staggered from each other, with the face-centered cubic being the more regular of the two. Pure copper, amongst other materials, forms a face-centered cubic lattice.

Uniform colorings 
There are three distinct uniform colorings of a hexagonal tiling, all generated from reflective symmetry of Wythoff constructions. The (h,k) represent the periodic repeat of one colored tile, counting hexagonal distances as h first, and k second. The same counting is used in the Goldberg polyhedra, with a notation {p+,3}h,k, and can be applied to hyperbolic tilings for p > 6.

The 3-color tiling is a tessellation generated by the order-3 permutohedrons.

Chamfered hexagonal tiling

A chamfered hexagonal tiling replacing edges with new hexagons and transforms into another hexagonal tiling. In the limit, the original faces disappear, and the new hexagons degenerate into rhombi, and it becomes a rhombic tiling.

Related tilings 

The hexagons can be dissected into sets of 6 triangles. This process leads to two 2-uniform tilings, and the triangular tiling:

The hexagonal tiling can be considered an elongated rhombic tiling, where each vertex of the rhombic tiling is stretched into a new edge. This is similar to the relation of the rhombic dodecahedron and the rhombo-hexagonal dodecahedron tessellations in 3 dimensions.

It is also possible to subdivide the prototiles of certain hexagonal tilings by two, three, four or nine equal pentagons:

Symmetry mutations

This tiling is topologically related as a part of a sequence of regular tilings with hexagonal faces, starting with the hexagonal tiling, with Schläfli symbol {6,n}, and Coxeter diagram , progressing to infinity.

This tiling is topologically related to regular polyhedra with vertex figure n3, as a part of a sequence that continues into the hyperbolic plane.

It is similarly related to the uniform truncated polyhedra with vertex figure n.6.6.

This tiling is also part of a sequence of truncated rhombic polyhedra and tilings with [n,3] Coxeter group symmetry. The cube can be seen as a rhombic hexahedron where the rhombi are squares. The truncated forms have regular n-gons at the truncated vertices, and nonregular hexagonal faces.

Wythoff constructions from hexagonal and triangular tilings 

Like the uniform polyhedra there are eight uniform tilings that can be based on the regular hexagonal tiling (or the dual triangular tiling).

Drawing the tiles colored red on the original faces, yellow at the original vertices, and blue along the original edges, there are 8 forms, 7 of which are topologically distinct. (The truncated triangular tiling is topologically identical to the hexagonal tiling.)

Monohedral convex hexagonal tilings 
There are 3 types of monohedral convex hexagonal tilings. They are all isohedral. Each has parametric variations within a fixed symmetry. Type 2 contains glide reflections, and is 2-isohedral keeping chiral pairs distinct.

Topologically equivalent tilings 

Hexagonal tilings can be made with the identical {6,3} topology as the regular tiling (3 hexagons around every vertex). With isohedral faces, there are 13 variations. Symmetry given assumes all faces are the same color. Colors here represent the lattice positions. Single-color (1-tile) lattices are parallelogon hexagons. 

Other isohedrally-tiled topological hexagonal tilings are seen as quadrilaterals and pentagons that are not edge-to-edge, but interpreted as colinear adjacent edges:

The 2-uniform and 3-uniform tessellations have a rotational degree of freedom which distorts 2/3 of the hexagons, including a colinear case that can also be seen as a non-edge-to-edge tiling of hexagons and larger triangles.

It can also be distorted into a chiral 4-colored tri-directional weaved pattern, distorting some hexagons into parallelograms. The weaved pattern with 2 colored faces has rotational 632 (p6) symmetry. A chevron pattern has pmg (22*) symmetry, which is lowered to p1 (°) with 3 or 4 colored tiles.

Circle packing 
The hexagonal tiling  can be used as a circle packing, placing equal-diameter circles at the center of every point. Every circle is in contact with 3 other circles in the packing (kissing number).  The gap inside each hexagon allows for one circle, creating the densest packing from the triangular tiling, with each circle in contact with a maximum of 6 circles.

Related regular complex apeirogons 

There are 2 regular complex apeirogons, sharing the vertices of the hexagonal tiling. Regular complex apeirogons have vertices and edges, where edges can contain 2 or more vertices. Regular apeirogons p{q}r are constrained by: 1/p + 2/q + 1/r = 1. Edges have p vertices, and vertex figures are r-gonal.

The first is made of 2-edges, three around every vertex, the second has hexagonal edges, three around every vertex. A third complex apeirogon, sharing the same vertices, is quasiregular, which alternates 2-edges and 6-edges.

See also

Hexagonal lattice
Hexagonal prismatic honeycomb
Tilings of regular polygons
List of uniform tilings
List of regular polytopes
 Hexagonal tiling honeycomb
Hex map board game design

References 

 Coxeter, H.S.M. Regular Polytopes, (3rd edition, 1973), Dover edition,  p. 296, Table II: Regular honeycombs
  (Chapter 2.1: Regular and uniform tilings, pp. 58–65)
 
 John H. Conway, Heidi Burgiel, Chaim Goodman-Strauss, The Symmetries of Things 2008,

External links 
 
 
 
 

Euclidean tilings
 
Isogonal tilings
Isohedral tilings
Regular tilings
Regular tessellations